‘Elisapeti Lavakei’aho Makoni Langi is a Tongan lawyer and judge. She was the first woman appointed as a magistrate in Tonga, and the first to serve on the Supreme Court of Tonga.

Langi was educated at the University of the South Pacific, initially studying foundation studies before completing a law degree at the Emalus campus in Vanuatu. She worked as a legal assistant in a community law center before becoming a Crown Prosecutor for the Tongan Attorney General's office. In March 2018 she was appointed as a magistrate, becoming the second woman appointed to such a role in Tonga. In September 2020 she was appointed as an acting justice to the Supreme Court of Tonga, becoming the first woman to serve on the court.

References

Living people
University of the South Pacific alumni
Tongan lawyers
Tongan civil servants
Tongan judges
Supreme Court of Tonga justices
Year of birth missing (living people)